Nationality words link to articles with information on the nation's poetry or literature (for instance, Irish or France).

Events

Works published in English

United Kingdom
 Thomas Aird, Orthuriel, and Other Poems
 Matthew Arnold, Alaric at Rome
 Robert Browning, Sordello
 Caroline Clive, under the pen name "V", IX Poems by 'V'''
 Thomas De Quincey, Recollections of the Lake Poets, final two essays on the Lake Poets published in Tait's Edinburgh Magazine (first essay published in 1836; see also Recollections 1835, 1839):
 "Westmoreland and the Dalesmen," January
 "Society of the Lakes, I, II, and III," January, March, and June
 Frederick William Faber, The Cherwell Water-Lily, and Other Poems Monckton Milnes, Poetry for the People Thomas Moore, The Poetical Works of Thomas Moore, in 10 volumes, published starting this year and ending in 1841; Irish poet published in the United Kingdom
 Robert Owen, The Social Bible Percy Bysshe Shelley, edited by Mary Shelley, Essays, Letters from Abroad, Translations and Fragments, including the essay "Defence of Poetry", posthumously published
 William Wordsworth, The Poetical Works of William Wordsworth, six volumes (see also reprint of 1842 with a seventh volume of additional poems; Miscellaneous Poems 1820; Poetical Works 1827; Poetical Works 1836; Poems 1845; Poetical Works 1857; Poetical Works, Centenary Edition, 1870)

Other in English
 Philip Pendleton Cooke, "Florence Vane", a popular ballad, often anthologized, written for the author's cousin; first published in Burton's Gentleman's Magazine at Edgar Allan Poe's request; United States
 Thomas Moore, The Poetical Works of Thomas Moore, in 10 volumes, published starting this year and ending in 1841; Irish poet published in the United Kingdom
 Frances Sargent Osgood, The Casket of Fate, United States
 Henry Wadsworth Longfellow, "The Wreck of the Hesperus", in New World, January 10, United States

Works published in other languages
 Hans Christian Andersen, Jeg er en Skandinav ("I am a Scandinavian"), Denmark
 José de Espronceda, Poesías, including complete version of El estudiante de Salamanca, Spain
 Abraham Emanuel Fröhlich, Ulrich Zwingli, Switzerland
 Victor Hugo, Les Rayons et les Ombres ("Beams and shadows"), France
 Mikhail Lermontov, Mtsyri ("The Novice"), Russia
 Taras Shevchenko, Kobzar ("The Bard"), Russia
 Henrik Wergeland, Jan van Huysums Blomsterstykke ("Flower-piece by Jan van Huysum"), Norway

Births
Death years link to the corresponding "[year] in poetry" article:
 January 13 – Nicholas Flood Davin (died 1901), Irish-born Canadian lawyer, journalist, politician and poet
 January 18 – Henry Austin Dobson (died 1921), English poet and essayist
 February 2 – Griffith Williams (Gutyn Peris) (died 1838), Welsh poet
 March 5 – Constance Fenimore Woolson (died 1894), American novelist, short-story writer and poet; a grandniece of James Fenimore Cooper
 March 18 – William Cosmo Monkhouse (died 1901), English poet and critic
 June 2 – Thomas Hardy (died 1928), English novelist and poet
 August 17 – Wilfred Scawen Blunt (died 1922), English poet and writer
 September 20 – Ellen Mary Clerke (died 1906), Irish author, journalist, poet and science writer
 October 5 – John Addington Symonds (died 1893), English poet and literary critic

Deaths
Death years link to the corresponding "[year] in poetry" article:
 June 7 – Népomucène Lemercier (born 1771), French poet and playwright
 June 12 – Gerald Griffin (born 1803), Irish novelist, poet and playwright
 July – Goronwy Owen (born 1723), Welsh poet
 July 7 – Nikolai Stankevich (born 1813), Russian philosopher and poet

See also

 19th century in poetry
 19th century in literature
 List of years in poetry
 List of years in literature
 Victorian literature
 French literature of the 19th century
 Biedermeier era of German literature
 List of years in poetry
 Golden Age of Russian Poetry (1800–1850)
 Young Germany (Junges Deutschland'') a loose group of German writers from about 1830 to 1850
 List of poets
 Poetry
 List of poetry awards

Notes

19th-century poetry

Poetry